Dyskinetic cerebral palsy (DCP) is a subtype of cerebral palsy (CP) and is characterized by impaired muscle tone regulation, coordination and movement control. Dystonia and choreoathetosis are the two most dominant movement disorders in patients with DCP.

Presentation 
In dyskinetic cerebral palsy, both motor and non-motor impairments are present. Motor impairments, such as impaired muscle tone regulations, lack of muscle control and bone deformations are often more severe compared to the other subtypes of CP. Non-motor impairments increase with motor severity. Half of the DCP group shows severe learning disabilities, 51% has epilepsy. Hearing and visual impairments occur frequently, respectively 11% and 45%. Dysarthria or anarthria are also common, so alternative and augmentative communication tools are needed.

Dystonia and choreoathetosis 
Dystonia and choreoathetosis mostly occur concurrently in DCP, but they are two independent motor disorders with their own characteristics. Dystonia predominates in most patients.

Dystonia (DYS) is defined by twisting and repetitive movements, abnormal postures due to sustained muscle contractions, and hypertonia. Dystonia is aggravated by voluntary movements and postures, or with stress, emotion or pain. A video of dystonia in a patient with dyskinetic cerebral palsy can be seen here: 

Choreoathetosis (CA) is characterized by hyperkinesia (chorea i.e. rapid involuntary, jerky, often fragmented movements) and hypokinesia (athetosis i.e. slower, constantly changing, writhing or contorting movements). A video of choreoathetosis in a patient with dyskinetic cerebral palsy can be seen here:

Clinical patterns 
Patients with DCP are more likely to obtain a high level of functional disability. Respectively 12,7% and 49% of the patients were assigned in level IV and V of the Gross Motor Function Classification System (GMFCS). The same trend appeared in manual ability with 21,8% in level IV and 43,6% in level V of the Manual Ability Classification System (MACS). A good correlation between the functional classification scales and the total dystonia level was found, meaning that a higher level of functional disability correlates with a higher dystonia level. The same study showed no associations with choreoathetosis. These results suggest that dystonia typically has a bigger impact on functionality and a larger effect on activity, participation and quality of life than choreoathetosis.

As previously mentioned, dystonia predominates in most patients, partly because dystonia is often more noticeable and severe than choreoathetosis. Both increase with activity and are generalized over all body regions with a higher severity in the upper limbs than in the lower limbs. Dystonia has a significantly higher level of severity in the distal parts of the extremities, whereas choreoathetosis is more equally distributed.

Causes 
Dyskinetic cerebral palsy could have multiple causes. The majority of the children are born at term and experience perinatal adverse events which can be supported by neuroimaging. Possible causes are perinatal hypoxic-ischaemia and neonatal shock in children born at term or near term. Hyperbilirubinaemia used to be a common contributing factor, but is now rare in high-income countries due to preventive actions. Other aetiological factors are growth retardation, brain maldevelopment, intracranial haemorrhage, stroke or cerebral infections.

Diagnosis 
Multiple classification systems using Magnetic Resonance Imaging (MRI) have been developed, linking brain lesions to time of birth, cerebral palsy subtype and functional ability. The overall goal of these studies is to elucidate etiology, timing of injury and pathogenesis of cerebral palsy.

Around 70% of patients with DCP show lesions in the cortical and deep grey matter of the brain, more specifically in the basal ganglia and thalamus. However, other brain lesions and even normal-appearing MRI findings can occur, for example white matter lesions and brain maldevelopments. Patients with pure basal ganglia and thalamus lesions are more likely to show more severe choreoathetosis whereas dystonia may be associated with other brain lesions, such as the cerebellum. These lesions occur mostly during the peri- and postnatal period since these regions have a high vulnerability during the late third trimester of the pregnancy. Unfortunately, contemporary imaging is not sophisticated enough to detect all subtle brain deformities and network disorders in dystonia. Research with more refined imaging techniques including diffusion tensor imaging and functional MRI is required.

Prevention
Prevention strategies have been developed for the different risk factors of the specific cerebral palsy subtypes. Primary prevention consists of reducing the possible risk factors. However, when multiple risk factors cluster together, prevention is much more difficult. Secondary preventions may be more appropriate at that time, e.g. prevention of prematurity. Studies showed a reduced risk of cerebral palsy when administering magnesium sulfate to women at risk of preterm delivery.

Cooling or therapeutic hypothermia for 72 hours immediately after birth has a significant clinical effect on reducing mortality and severity of neurodevelopmental disabilities in neonates with birth asphyxia. This has been documented for newborns with hypoxic-ischemic encephalopathy.

Management

Measurement 
Measuring dystonia and choreoathetosis can be very challenging. It is however crucial to have reliable measurements for the evaluation and effects of targeted management. So far, measurements involved the usage of clinical qualitative assessment scales judged by video observation. The Barry-Albright Dystonia Rating Scale (BADS), the Burke-Fahn-Marsden Dystonia Rating Scale (BFMS) and the Dyskinesia Impairment Scale (DIS) are most commonly used.

The BADS was developed and validated to assess secondary dystonia in patients with CP. The BFMS has been validated for use in primary dystonia and is clinically the most used scale in both primary and secondary dystonia. Both the BADS and BFMS do not include scoring for choreoathetosis. The DIS is currently stated as the most sensitive, valid and reliable scale. It has been validated for use in secondary dystonia, as it occurs in patients with DCP. The value lays in its detailed full-body consideration and the differentiation action-rest, proximal-distal limb and duration-amplitude. Moreover, the DIS includes both the evaluation of dystonia and choreoathetosis. Although this scale is currently seen as the gold standard to evaluate patients with DCP in research, substantial time and experience with the current CA and DYS definitions is needed from the rater in scoring dystonia and choreoathetosis.

Both the DIS and BFMS can be used as outcome measure in intervention studies such as deep brain stimulation (DBS) or intrathecal baclofen.

Aim of treatment interventions 
Dyskinetic cerebral palsy is a non-progressive, non-reversible disease. The current management is symptomatic, since there is no cure. The main goal is to improve daily activity, quality of life and autonomy of the children by creating a timed and targeted management.

The many management options for patients with DCP are not appropriate as standalone treatment but must be seen within an individualized multidisciplinary rehabilitation program.

Medical and rehabilitation interventions
Management options can be subdivided into medical treatment and rehabilitation interventions.

Medical treatment consists of oral medication and surgery. Before using oral drugs, it is important to differentiate between spasticity, dystonia and choreoathetosis since each motor disorder has a specific approach. In general, many oral drugs have low efficacy, unwanted side-effects and variable effects. Oral baclofen and trihexyphenidyl are commonly used to decrease dystonia, although its efficacy is relatively low in most patients. Adverse effects of the latter can include worsening of choreoathetosis. Since dystonia predominates over choreoathetosis in most patients, reducing dystonia allows the possibility of a full expression of choreoathetosis. This suggests that the discrimination of dystonia and choreoathetosis is crucial, since misinterpretations in diagnosing can contribute to the administration of inappropriate medication, causing unwanted effects. Intrathecal baclofen pump (ITB) is often used as an alternative to reduce side-effects of the oral dystonic medication over the whole body and botulinum toxin injections are applied to decrease dystonia in specific muscles or muscle groups. Research on the effects of ITB and botulinum toxin on choreoathetosis is lacking.

Regarding surgical treatment in patients with DCP, deep brain stimulation (DBS) has shown to decrease dystonia. However, the responsiveness is less beneficial and the effects are more variable than in patients with inherited or primary dystonia. The effects on choreoathetosis have not been investigated.

Orthopedic surgery is performed to correct musculoskeletal deformities, but it is recommended that all other alternatives are considered first.

The previous management options need to be combined with rehabilitation programs, adapted to the specific needs of each individual. Unfortunately, evidence for rehabilitation strategies is scarce and is based on clinical expertise. The team of caregivers can consist of physiotherapists, occupational therapists and speech/communication therapists. The therapy mainly focusses on the motor problems by using principles of neuroplasticity, patterning, postural balance, muscle strengthening and stretching. Non-motor impairments such as epilepsy require specific treatment.

Prevalence 
Dyskinetic cerebral palsy is the second most common subtype of cerebral palsy, after spastic CP. A European Cerebral Palsy study reported a rate of 14,4% of patients with DCP which is similar to the rate of 15% reported in Sweden. The rate appeared lower in Australia, where data from states with full population-based ascertainment listed DCP as the predominant motor type in only 7% of the cases. The differences reported from various registers and countries may relate to under-identification of dyskinetic CP due to a lack of standardization in definition and classification based on predominant type.

References 

Cerebral palsy types